According to the Köppen climate classification, most of Western Oregon has a warm-summer mediterranean climate (or Csb type), which features warm, dry summers, and wet winters with frequent overcast and cloudy skies. Eastern Oregon falls into the cold semi-arid climate (or BSk type), which features drier weather.

West of the Cascade Range, winters are chilly with frequent rain and occasional snow. Temperatures can get very cold, but only occasionally, as the result of Arctic cold waves. The high desert region of the state is much drier, with less rain, more snow, colder winters, and hotter summers.

Precipitation

The Pacific Ocean, the moisture-laden air above it, and the storms moving from it over the Oregon coast, are major factors in the state's precipitation patterns. As humid ocean air flows east from the ocean and encounters the Coast Range, it rises steeply, cools, and loses moisture through condensation, which produces heavy rain. At lower elevations along the coast, orographic precipitation is less intense but still produces  a year.

In the Willamette Valley east of the Coast Range, storms "blowing" from the Pacific retain enough moisture to drop from  annually in the most heavily populated part of the state.

The remaining two-thirds of the state is relatively dry, classified as semi-arid, with large areas receiving no more than  a year. Exceptions occur at higher elevations in the Blue Mountains and the Wallowa Mountains to the northeast, which get  a year.

Across Oregon, the wet season runs from November through March, when the jet stream is strongest in the Northern Hemisphere. Precipitation is less in the months between winter and summer: April through June in the spring and September and October in the fall. Statewide, the dry months are July and August, when moisture arrives during afternoon thunderstorms, mainly in the mountains, and less often from storms that reach the north coast and adjacent counties.

Snow

 
Snowfall in Oregon is greatest in the Cascade Range. The state's largest annual snowfall on record, occurred at Crater Lake in the Cascades in 1950. On the other hand, most winter precipitation in the Coast Range falls as rain, though heavy snow sometimes occurs.

In most mountain areas in Oregon, the ground above  is covered with snow from December through April.

Annual snowfall along the coastal plain averages  a year, including years with none. Further inland, between the Coast Range and the Cascades, snowfall generally averages from  a year.

Temperature

In addition to seasonal cycles in solar radiation (more in summer, less in winter), major factors affecting temperatures in Oregon include the moderating influence of the Pacific Ocean combined with variations in surface elevation, especially the Cascade Range. In general, temperatures on Earth drop by about 4 °F (2 °C) per each  increase in elevation. Throughout the year, high elevations across the state tend to be cooler than low elevations. In addition, the Cascades, running north–south from border to border, generally retain relatively warm Pacific air masses on the western side of the state and relatively cool continental air masses on the eastern side. This prevailing pattern breaks down occasionally when dense cold air flows down the Columbia Gorge into the Willamette Valley and lowers temperatures more than usual from Portland to Eugene.

Oregon has a wide range of temperatures, though the extremes are rare. The highest was recorded on July 29, 1898, in Hermiston, Oregon, and again on August 10, 1898, in Redmond, Oregon, both east of the Cascades, when the temperature reached . The temperature in the Willamette Valley is mild compared to the desert regions of the state, with high temperatures at or above  occurring only five to fifteen times per year, and low temperatures below  similarly infrequent. The hottest area of the state is the southwest; Jackson County is the warmest place in the state during summer.

Selected climate charts

See also
Climate of the United States
Climate change in Oregon

References

Works cited
 
 

 
Oregon